The 2017 Valdosta State Blazers football team represented Valdosta State University as a member of the Gulf South Conference (GSC) during the 2017 NCAA Division II football season. They were led by second-year head coach Kerwin Bell and played their home games at Bazemore–Hyder Stadium in Valdosta, Georgia. Valdosta State compiled an overall record of 5–4 with a mark of 5–3 in conference play, placing in a five-way tie for second in the GSC.

Schedule
Valdosta State announced its 2017 football schedule on March 17, 2017. The schedule consisted of four home games, five away games, and one neutral site game in the regular season. The Blazers hosted GSC foes Florida Tech, Mississippi College, North Alabama, and West Alabama and traveled to Delta State, Shorter, West Florida, and West Georgia.

The Blazers were scheduled to travel to both non-conference games, which were against  of the Southern Intercollegiate Athletic Conference (SAIC) a neutral site game against , also from the SIAC.

The game between Fort Valley State and Valdosta State was cancelled in advance of the arrival of Hurricane Irma.

Rankings

References

Valdosta State
Valdosta State Blazers football seasons
Valdosta State Blazers football